Sebastián Vega (Bucaramanga) is an actor from Colombia.

He is known for starring in the series A mano Limpia from RCN and being from the secondary distribution of Isa tk+ from Nickelodeon. In 2016 he starred in the Netflix series Narcos.

Filmography 
2005, Padres e hijos...Emilio
2008, Aqui no hay quien viva...Pablo Guerra
2008, El Cartel de los Sapos...Pepe cadena
2009, Tu voz estéreo...vários
2010, Isa tk+...Kike Toro
2010, A mano limpia...El Baby
2011, Popland!...Guga Mortols
2012/2013, A mano limpia 2...El baby
2013, Amo de casa...mauro
2013, Chica Vampiro...Nicolás De Black Mer Moon
2013, Baby Daddy… Max Doodle
2014, The Ellen DeGeneres Show… himself
2014, La Suegra...Luis Guillermo Burgos Valencia
2016, Narcos…Hugo Martinez Jr.
2021, El Cartel de los Sapos: el origen…Alonso Torres
2022, Pasión de Gavilanes…Félix Carreño

References 

Colombian male telenovela actors
Colombian male television actors
Living people
1987 births